The electoral division of Hobart is one of the 15 electoral divisions in the Tasmanian Legislative Council. It was originally created in 1856 when the Council became the upper house of the Parliament of Tasmania. The seat was abolished in 1999 and re-created in 2008 after a redistribution saw the former division of Wellington returned to its former name.

As of 31 January 2019, there were 24,007 enrolled electors in the division.

Since 2012, the member in the Legislative Council has been Independent MLC Rob Valentine, who was the Lord Mayor of Hobart from 1999 to 2011. The next election in the division is due in May 2018.

Members

See also

 Electoral division of Wellington
 Tasmanian House of Assembly

References

External links
Parliament of Tasmania
Tasmanian Electoral Commission - Legislative Council

Hobart